Murder Ballad is a musical with music and lyrics by Juliana Nash, and book and lyrics by Julia Jordan.

Synopsis 
Murder Ballad is about a young woman named Sara who dates a wild bartender named Tom but breaks up with him for Michael, a student at NYU with a more sensible life than Tom's dangerous ways. After getting married and raising a child, Sara starts to long for the old life with Tom. She begins secretly seeing Tom, but as her affair gets more passionate with him, Sara longs to go back to the normal life she had with Michael and her daughter.

Musical numbers 

 "Murder Ballad" - Narrator, Michael, Sara, Tom
 "Narrator 1" - Narrator, Sara, Tom
 "I Love NY" - Sara, Tom
 "Narrator 2" - Narrator
 "Little By Little" - Michael, Sara
 "Troubled Mind / Promises" - Michael, Sara
 "Narrator 3" -  Narrator
 "Turning Into Beautiful" - Michael, Sara
 "Crying Scene Theme" - Narrator
 "I Love NY Reprise 1 / Narrator 4" - Tom, Narrator
 "Prattle 1 / Narrator 5" - Michael, Sara, Narrator
 "Coffee's On" - Sara, Narrator
 "Prattle 2" - Michael, Sara
 "Narrator 6" - Narrator
 "Sara" - Tom, Narrator, Sara
 "Narrator 7" - Narrator
 "Mouth Tattoo" - Sara, Tom, Narrator
 "Narrator 8" - Narrator
 "Sugar Cubes and Rock Salt" - Michael
 "Prattle 3" - Michael, Sara, Tom

 "My Name" - Tom, Sara
 "The Crying Scene" - Narrator
 "Coffee's On Reprise" - Michael, Sara, Tom
 "Built for Longing" - Sara, Michael, Tom, Narrator
 "Answer Me" - Sara, Michael, Tom
 "You Belong to Me" - Tom, Sara
 "Narrator 9" - Narrator
 "Troubled Mind Reprise" - Sara, Michael
 "I Love NY Reprise 2" - Tom, Narrator
 "Prattle 4"- Sara, Michael
 "I'll Be There" - Tom, Narrator
 "Prattle 5" - Michael, Tom, Sara
 "Little By Little Reprise" - Michael, Sara
 "Narrator 10 / You Belong to Me Reprise" - Sara, Narrator, Michael, Tom
 "Crying Scene Reprise" - Narrator
 "Narrator 11" - Narrator
 "Walk Away / Promises Reprise" - Sara, Michael
 "Clubs and DIamonds / Prattle 6" - Narrator, Sara
 "Finale" - Narrator, Michael, Sara, Tom

Productions 
Murder Ballad had its world premiere Off-Broadway, where it was produced at Manhattan Theatre Club's Stage II theatre. The production opened on November 15, 2012, following previews from October 31. The cast included John Ellison Conlee, Rebecca Naomi Jones, Will Swenson and Karen Olivo. Originally scheduled to close on December 2, the production was extended by two weeks and closed on December 16, 2012. A cast recording was released. The production transferred to the Off-Broadway Union Square Theatre on May 22, 2013, following previews from May 7. It closed on July 21, 2013. Casting remained the same except for the departure of Karen Olivo, who was replaced by Caissie Levy. The production was nominated for the 2013 Lucille Lortel Award, Outstanding Musical, 2013 Off Broadway Alliance Award, Best New Musical and 2013 Outer Critics Circle Award, Outstanding New Off-Broadway Musical.

The regional premiere took place at TUTS Underground in Houston, Texas in April 2014, with a cast featuring Lauren Molina, Steel Burkhardt, Kristin Warren and Pat McRoberts.

Murder Ballad has its European premiere in Belgium on 9 March 2016. It was translated into Dutch and performed by muziektheater proMITHEus in Leuven, Antwerp and Ghent.

The musical had its UK premiere at the Arts Theatre in the West End, with an opening night on 5 October 2016, following previews from 30 September. The cast featured Kerry Ellis as Sara, Ramin Karimloo as Tom, Norman Bowman as Michael and Victoria Hamilton-Barritt as the narrator (who was nominated for the Laurence Olivier Award for Best Actress in a Supporting Role in a Musical). The production received three nominations at the 2017 Whatsonstage.com Awards, with acting nods for both Karimloo and Hamilton-Barritt, and best video design for Laura Perrett. It played a limited run to 3 December 2016.

In 2017, Murder Ballad was presented in Argentina, featuring Florencia Otero as Sara, German Tripel as Michael, Patricio Arellano as Tom, and Sofia Rangone as the Narrator.

2019 saw an Italian version, with lyrics translated and adapted.

From September 2020 till Juny 2021, a fully Corona-Proof version produced by STENT Producties will tour throughout the Netherlands, the tour has about 100 shows. The producer recently announced that it would bring the Dutch version to Belgium in 2022

In 2020, the Australasian Premiere took place in Greymouth, New Zealand in September. The production was performed at the Regent Theatre Greymouth, from September 23-26, 2020. It was produced by the SuperBrain ProductioNZ, and was directed by Jamie Mosher. The cast featured Rosie Barnes as Sara, Cary Lancaster as Michael, Stephen Brassett as Tom, and Helen Wallis as Narrator.

Characters and original casts

References

External links
Internet Off-Broadway Database

2012 musicals
Off-Broadway musicals
West End musicals
Sung-through musicals